Club Marsanz Fútbol Sala was a futsal club based in Torrejón de Ardoz, Community of Madrid. Marsanz Torrejón was one of the most important futsal clubs from Spain.

The club was founded in 1980 and its stadium was the ground Joaquín Blume with capacity of 4,000 seats.

The club was founded by the Marsanz company. 

The club was also known as Pennzoil Marsanz from 1991 to 1993 thanks the sponsorship of Pennzoil.

History
The club was founded in 1980. The team played in División de Honor 5 seasons and won 1 championship (1992–93). The Interviú-Marsanz duels always will be remembered. In the 1994–95 season, the team was relegated to División de Plata. Although Marsanz Torrejón achieved the promotion to División de Honor in the 1996–97 season, at begin of season, the chairman decided to dissolve the club due to the economic limitations.

Season to season

6 seasons in División de Honor
1 season in División de Plata

Trophies
División de Honor: 1
Winners: 1992–93
Runners-Up: 1990–91
Copa de España: 2
Winners: 1991–92, 1993–94
Runners-Up: 1990–91
Supercopa de España: 2
Winners: 1992–93, 1994–95
Runners-Up: 1993–94
European Championship: 1
Winners: 1994

References

External links
Tribute 15 years after its dissolution
Interview to Mariano Sanz, former Marsanz chairman 

Futsal clubs in Spain
Sports teams in the Community of Madrid
Futsal clubs established in 1980
Sports clubs disestablished in 1996
1980 establishments in Spain
1996 disestablishments in Spain
Sport in Torrejón de Ardoz